East Fultonham is a census-designated place in central Newton Township, Muskingum County, Ohio, United States.  It has a post office with the ZIP code 43735.  It is located along U.S. Route 22 a short distance east of the village of Fultonham.

East Fultonham had its start when the railroad was extended to that point.  The community was named for its location east of Fultonham.

It is noted as the birthplace of U.S. Vice President Thomas A. Hendricks. A private lake and beach club, Lake Isabella, has been a popular summer destination since 1939.

References

Further reading
 Schneider, Norris F., A Small History of A Small Town: East Fultonham, Muskingum County, Ohio, Zanesville Times Signal, October 6, 1957.

Census-designated places in Ohio
Census-designated places in Muskingum County, Ohio